In functional analysis, one is interested in extensions of symmetric operators acting on a Hilbert space. Of particular importance is the existence, and sometimes explicit constructions, of self-adjoint extensions. This problem arises, for example, when one needs to specify domains of self-adjointness for formal expressions of observables in quantum mechanics. Other applications of solutions to this problem can be seen in various moment problems.

This article discusses a few related problems of this type. The unifying theme is that each problem has an operator-theoretic characterization which gives a corresponding parametrization of solutions. More specifically, finding self-adjoint extensions, with various requirements, of symmetric operators is equivalent to finding unitary extensions of suitable partial isometries.

Symmetric operators 
Let H be a Hilbert space. A linear operator A acting on H with dense domain Dom(A) is symmetric if

 for all x, y in  Dom(A).

If Dom(A) = H, the Hellinger-Toeplitz theorem says that A is a bounded operator, in which case A is self-adjoint and the extension problem is trivial. In general, a symmetric operator is self-adjoint if the domain of its adjoint, Dom(A*), lies in Dom(A).

When dealing with unbounded operators, it is often desirable to be able to assume that the operator in question is closed. In the present context, it is a convenient fact that every symmetric operator A is 
closable. That is, A has the smallest closed extension, called the closure of A. This can
be shown by invoking the symmetric assumption and Riesz representation theorem. Since A and its closure have the same closed extensions, it can always be assumed that the symmetric operator of interest is closed.

In the sequel, a symmetric operator will be assumed to be densely defined and closed.

Problem Given a densely defined closed symmetric operator A, find its self-adjoint extensions.

This question can be translated to an operator-theoretic one. As a heuristic motivation, notice that the Cayley transform on the complex plane, defined by

maps the real line to the unit circle. This suggests one define, for a symmetric operator A,

on Ran(A + i), the range of A + i. The operator UA is in fact an isometry between closed subspaces that takes (A + i)x to (A - i)x for x in Dom(A). The map

is also called the Cayley transform of the symmetric operator A. Given UA, A can be recovered by

defined on Dom(A) = Ran(U - 1). Now if

 
is an isometric extension of UA, the operator

acting on

is a symmetric extension of A.

Theorem The symmetric extensions of a closed symmetric operator A is in one-to-one correspondence with the isometric extensions of its Cayley transform UA.

Of more interest is the existence of self-adjoint extensions. The following is true.

Theorem A closed symmetric operator A is self-adjoint if and only if Ran (A ± i) = H, i.e. when its Cayley transform UA is a unitary operator on H.

Corollary The self-adjoint extensions of a closed symmetric operator A is in one-to-one correspondence with the unitary extensions of its Cayley transform UA.

Define the deficiency subspaces of A by

and

In this language, the description of the self-adjoint extension problem given by the corollary can be restated as follows: a symmetric operator A has self-adjoint extensions if and only if its Cayley transform UA has unitary extensions to H, i.e. the deficiency subspaces K+ and K− have the same dimension.

An example 
Consider the Hilbert space L2[0,1]. On the subspace of absolutely continuous function that vanish on the boundary, define the operator A by

Integration by parts shows A is symmetric. Its adjoint A* is the same operator with Dom(A*) being the absolutely continuous functions with no boundary condition. We will see that extending A amounts to modifying the boundary conditions, thereby enlarging Dom(A) and reducing Dom(A*), until the two coincide.

Direct calculation shows that K+ and K− are one-dimensional subspaces given by

and

where a is a normalizing constant. So the self-adjoint extensions of A are parametrized by the unit circle in the complex plane, . For each unitary Uα : K− → K+, defined by Uα(φ−) = αφ+, there corresponds an extension Aα with domain

If f ∈ Dom(Aα), then f is absolutely continuous and

Conversely, if f is absolutely continuous and f(0) = γf(1) for some complex γ with |γ| = 1, then f lies in the above domain.

The self-adjoint operators { Aα } are instances of the momentum operator in quantum mechanics.

Self-adjoint extension on a larger space 

Every partial isometry can be extended, on a possibly larger space, to a unitary operator. Consequently, every symmetric operator has a self-adjoint extension, on a possibly larger space.

Positive symmetric operators 
A symmetric operator A is called positive if  for all x in Dom(A). It is known that for every such A, one has dim(K+) = dim(K−). Therefore, every positive symmetric operator has self-adjoint extensions. The more interesting question in this direction is whether A has positive self-adjoint extensions.

For two positive operators A and B, we put A ≤ B if

in the sense of bounded operators.

Structure of 2 × 2 matrix contractions 
While the extension problem for general symmetric operators is essentially that of extending partial isometries to unitaries, for positive symmetric operators the question becomes one of extending contractions: by "filling out" certain unknown entries of a 2 × 2 self-adjoint contraction, we obtain the positive self-adjoint extensions of a positive symmetric operator.

Before stating the relevant result, we first fix some terminology. For a contraction Γ, acting on H, we define its defect operators by

The defect spaces of Γ are

The defect operators indicate the non-unitarity of Γ, while the defect spaces ensure uniqueness in some parameterizations.
Using this machinery, one can explicitly describe the structure of general matrix contractions. We will only need the 2 × 2 case. Every 2 × 2 contraction Γ can be uniquely expressed as

where each Γi is a contraction.

Extensions of Positive symmetric operators 
The Cayley transform for general symmetric operators can be adapted to this special case. For every non-negative number a,

This suggests we assign to every positive symmetric operator A a contraction

defined by

which have matrix representation

It is easily verified that the Γ1 entry, CA projected onto Ran(A + 1) = Dom(CA), is self-adjoint. The operator A can be written as

with Dom(A) = Ran(CA - 1). If

is a contraction that extends CA and its projection onto its domain is self-adjoint, then it is clear that its inverse Cayley transform

defined on

is a positive symmetric extension of A. The symmetric property follows from its projection onto its own domain being self-adjoint and positivity follows from contractivity. The converse is also true: given a positive symmetric extension of A, its Cayley transform is a contraction satisfying the stated "partial" self-adjoint property.

Theorem The positive symmetric extensions of A are in one-to-one correspondence with the extensions of its Cayley transform where if C is such an extension, we require C projected onto Dom(C) be self-adjoint.

The unitarity criterion of the Cayley transform is replaced by self-adjointness for positive operators.

Theorem A symmetric positive operator A is self-adjoint if and only if its Cayley transform is a self-adjoint contraction defined on all of H, i.e. when Ran(A + 1) = H.

Therefore, finding self-adjoint extension for a positive symmetric operator becomes a "matrix completion problem". Specifically, we need to embed the column contraction CA into a 2 × 2 self-adjoint contraction. This can always be done and the structure of such contractions gives a parametrization of all possible extensions.

By the preceding subsection, all self-adjoint extensions of CA takes the form

So the self-adjoint positive extensions of A are in bijective correspondence with the self-adjoint contractions Γ4 on the defect space

of Γ3. The contractions

 
give rise to positive extensions

respectively. These are the smallest and largest positive extensions of A in the sense that

for any positive self-adjoint extension B of A. The operator A∞ is the Friedrichs extension of A and A0 is the von Neumann-Krein extension of A.

Similar results can be obtained for accretive operators.

References 
A. Alonso and B. Simon, The Birman-Krein-Vishik theory of self-adjoint extensions of semibounded operators. J. Operator Theory 4 (1980), 251-270.
Gr. Arsene and A. Gheondea, Completing matrix contractions, J. Operator Theory 7 (1982), 179-189.
 N. Dunford and J.T. Schwartz, Linear Operators, Part II, Interscience, 1958.
 B.C. Hall, Quantum Theory for Mathematicians, Chapter 9, Springer, 2013.
M. Reed and B. Simon, Methods of Modern Mathematical Physics, vol. I and II, Academic Press, 1975.

Functional analysis
Operator theory
Linear operators